Team Corratec is a UCI ProTeam status road bicycle racing team based in Italy.

The team was founded in 2022, holding UCI Continental status. In December 2022, the Union Cycliste Internationale announced that Team Corratec was granted a UCI ProTeam licence for 2023 season.

Team roster

Major wins
Sources:
2022
Stage 2 Vuelta al Táchira, Dušan Rajović
Stage 2 Tour of Antalya, Dušan Rajović
Poreč Trophy, Dušan Rajović
 National Time Trial Championships, Dušan Rajović
 National Road Race Championships, Dušan Rajović
Stage 3b Sibiu Cycling Tour, Stefano Gandin
Vuelta a Venezuela
Stages 1 & 8, Stefano Gandin
Stages 2 & 7, Dušan Rajović
Stage 6, Veljko Stojnić
Stage 4 Tour de la Guadeloupe, Veljko Stojnić

National champions
2022
 Serbia Road Race, Dušan Rajović
 Serbia Time Trial, Dušan Rajović

References

External links

Cycling teams established in 2022
Cycling teams based in Italy
UCI Professional Continental teams